Enrique Robles of Madrid, Spain, also known as Chicorrito was a champion torero in Mexico and in Spain. By 1927 he killed over 1,000 bulls and had 70 scars from being gored.

Biography
He toured the United States between 1902 and 1929 giving bullfights. In 1929 he had to cancel his exhibition when the police refused to let him hold a demonstration in Times Square. He may be buried in Valencia, Spain.

References

Spanish bullfighters
Year of birth missing
Year of death missing